Jacob Gottschalk Ascher (18 February 1841, Plymouth, England – 12 October 1912, New York City) was a British–Canadian chess master. He was the son of Isaac Gottschalk Ascher, and brother to Isidor, Albert, Hyman, and Eva.

Ascher twice won the Canadian Chess Championship; the 6th CAN-ch at Montreal 1878/79, and (tied for first) the 10th CAN-ch at Montreal 1882/83.  
He defeated George Henry Mackenzie at Montreal in one of fourteen simultaneous games played by Mackenzie on January 14, 1879.

He was a chess columnist at New Dominion Monthly published in Montreal.
He was Editor of the Montreal Star and was president of the Young Men's Hebrew Association of Montreal, the first Jewish charitable organization in Canada.

Ascher died in New York on 12 October 1912.

References

1841 births
1912 deaths
Anglophone Quebec people
Sportspeople from Plymouth, Devon
English emigrants to Canada
English Jews
English people of German-Jewish descent
Jewish Canadian sportspeople
Canadian people of German-Jewish descent
English chess players
Canadian chess players
Jewish chess players
Sportspeople from Montreal
19th-century chess players